Qurghan is a district in Faryab province, Afghanistan.  It was created in 2005 from the western part of Andkhoy District. The district center Qurghan is very close to Andkhoy at 317 m altitude.

As of 2003, the population is 27,116.

Notes

References

External links
 Map of Settlements IMMAP, 2011

Districts of Faryab Province